The Breede River Canoe Marathon is an annual South African K2 (doubles) race down the Breede River from Robertson to Swellendam in the Western Cape over a distance of 75 km. The two-day race through scenic wine country, was first run in 1968, and is usually held during September when good rains ensure reasonable water levels.

External links
Canoeing South Africa
Official website
Facebook Page
Day 2 route map
Day 1 route map
Gallery

References

Canoeing and kayaking competitions in South Africa
Canoe marathon
1968 establishments in South Africa
Recurring sporting events established in 1968